Haywood High School is a public high school located in Brownsville, Tennessee, originally built for the purpose of educating white students only.  It is now the sole public high school in Haywood County.

History
From the start, two separate school systems were created and maintained; one for white children, the other for black. In response to the federal court case Brown v. Board of Education, a "freedom of choice" plan was adopted for the 1966 school year, but this did very little to integrate the schools (in fact, no white students attended any of the schools previously designated for blacks). In 1970, there were approximately 4,000 negro and 2,000 white students in the two systems. Another lawsuit, United States v. Haywood County Board of Education, filed in 1967, ruled the plan invalid. In defense of the choice plan, the Board of Education stated there had only been two Ku Klux Klan meetings in the county in recent years, and that no instance of bombing, arson, or cross-burning had been shown to be attributable to school desegregation. In particular, they commented that the same night a negro civil rights leader's house was bombed, a white persons was also bombed, and that the threatening anonymous letters and phone calls were "few and far between." They further argued that negative instances were brought on by two civil rights leaders, a white man and woman, were living, unmarried, in homes with Negroes, and that was the source of the violent reaction of Haywood County citizens. The court rejected these arguments and set forth a blueprint for integration of the schools by 1970.

In 1970, a new school was built for the purpose of integrating black students from Carver High School.

In the early 1990s, it was noted in news reports that the school had a racially motivated selection system for homecoming queen, requiring alternating winners who were white, then black. Haywood County is the only county in Tennessee with a Black majority.

In March 2012, principal Dorothy received scrutiny for reportedly telling gay students that they would go to hell, threatening them with 60-day suspensions for public displays of affection, and other verbal attacks on gay and pregnant students.  As a result of the attention that this remark engendered, Bond resigned on March 1, 2012.

On December 4, 2017, students walked out of class to do a peaceful protest for alleged racial remarks on social media about "stringing" black people up. January 2018, the school got assigned to a new principal and assistant principal, Latonya Jackson and football coach of Haywood High School, Steve Hookfin.

Notable alumni

 Tony Delk (1992), NBA basketball player
 Brett Scallions, lead singer of the band Fuel
 Jarvis Varnado, NBA basketball player

References

External links
Official website

Public high schools in Tennessee
Schools in Haywood County, Tennessee
1970 establishments in Tennessee